Gamindu Kanishka (born 27 January 1987) is a Sri Lankan cricketer. He made his first-class debut for Saracens Sports Club in the 2007–08 Premier Trophy on 18 January 2008.

References

External links
 

1987 births
Living people
Sri Lankan cricketers
Saracens Sports Club cricketers
People from Ratnapura